Aston Villa competed in the Football League First Division during the 1988–89 English football season, having earned a promotion back to the First Division under their manager Graham Taylor. Although the team saw a slump in performances towards the end of the season, Aston Villa narrowly avoided relegation in the 1988–89 season after a draw on the final day of the season.

Diary of the season
The start of the season saw Gordon Cowans rejoin Aston Villa in a £250,000 deal, following 3 years at Bari.  Striker, Warren Aspinall, left in a £315,000 deal, as Portsmouth manager, Alan Ball, aimed for an immediate return to the First Division.

27 August 1988: Millwall began their First Division career with a 2–2 draw against Aston Villa at Villa Park.

2 October 1988: Aston Villa sold defender Neale Cooper to Rangers for £300,000.

5 November 1988: Manchester United drew with Aston Villa at home with a score of 1–1. This was the Manchester United's fifth draw of the season.

12 November 1988: After a 3–1 home win over Aston Villa, Southampton achieved their third win of the season.

26 November 1988: Coventry's 2–1 home win over local rivals, Aston Villa, saw them jump to fifth place in the table.

3 December 1988: Norwich City remained at the top of the First Division despite a 3–1 defeat to Aston Villa. However, Arsenal sat just three points behind them, with two games still to play.

24 December 1988: Aston Villa sold striker Garry Thompson to Watford for £325,000.

31 December 1988: After defeating Aston Villa 3–0, Arsenal replaced Norwich City at the top the First Division due to a higher goal difference.

15 April 1989 – Everton beat Norwich City 1–0 in the FA Cup semi-finals at Villa Park. The other semi-final saw one of English football's greatest ever tragedies, with the death of 96  Liverpool supporters, during a match against Nottingham Forest at Hillsborough.

13 May 1989 – Middlesbrough joined already relegated Newcastle United, after losing a relegation showdown 1–0 away to Sheffield Wednesday, whilst Luton Town beat Norwich City 1–0. The result ensured Wednesday's survival. West Ham United, however, had to win their last two games to stay up—at the expense of Aston Villa.

References

Aston Villa F.C. seasons
Aston Villa